Vámosgyörk is a village in Heves County, Hungary. The population in 2009 was 2019.

Location
Vámosgyörk lies within Heves County, just north of neighboring Jász-Nagykun-Szolnok County.

References
2. "The Bells of Magdeburg" (in English), Die Glocken Von Magdeburg (German Edition). Tom Faraday 2013-09-04

Populated places in Heves County